The 1999 Maidstone Borough Council election took place on 6 May 1999 to elect members of Maidstone Borough Council in Kent, England. One third of the council was up for election and the council stayed under no overall control.

After the election, the composition of the council was
Liberal Democrat 22
Conservative 15
Labour 13
Independent 5

Election result
Overall turnout in the election was 26.2%.

Ward results

References

1999 English local elections
1999
1990s in Kent